The Oriental leaf-toed gecko (Hemidactylus bowringii), also known commonly as the Asian smooth gecko, Bowring's gecko, Bowring's smooth gecko, and the Sikkimese dark-spotted gecko, is a species of lizard in the family Gekkonidae. The species is native to East Asia.

Etymology
The specific name, bowringii, is in honor of either John Charles Bowring, who was a British amateur naturalist and businessman in Hong Kong, or his father John Bowring, who was a British diplomat and a governor of Hong Kong.

Description
Boulenger (1885) described H. bowringii as follows: "Snout longer than the distance between the eye and the ear-opening, 1.4 times the diameter of the orbit; forehead slightly concave; ear-opening small, roundish. Body and limbs moderate; a slight fold of the skin along the flank. Digits free, moderately dilated, inner well developed; infradigital lamellae obliquely curved, 5 under the thumb, 7 or 8 under the fourth finger, 5 or 6 under the first toe, and 9 or 10 under the fourth toe. Upper surfaces covered with uniform small granular scales, largest on the snout, smallest on the occiput. Rostral four-sided, twice as broad as deep, with median cleft above; nostril pierced between the rostral, the first labial, and three or four nasals; 9 to 11 upper and 7 or 8 lower labials; mental large, triangular, followed by a pair of chin-shields; an outer pair of much smaller chin-shields. Abdominal scales moderate, cycloid, imbricate. Male with a series of preanal pores, interrupted mesially, composed of 13 pores on each side. Tail depressed, rounded, oval in section, covered above with uniform small scales, beneath with a median series of transversely dilated plates. Light brown above, with darker spots, having sometimes a tendency to form four longitudinal bands on the back; frequently small whitish spots on the body and limbs; a dark streak passing through the eye; tail above with small chevron-shaped markings; lower surfaces whitish.

From snout to vent ; tail ."

Geographic range
Hemidactylus bowringii is found in East Asia, including Bhutan, Nepal, southern China, Taiwan, Hong Kong, Vietnam (Ha Noi; Hon Thom Island), and Japan (Ryukyu Islands = Okinawa).

Habitat

Reproduction
Hemidactylus bowringii is oviparous. Clutch size is 2–3 eggs, which hatch after 30 days of incubation.

References

Further reading
Boulenger GA (1885). Catalogue of the Lizards in the British Museum (Natural History). Second Edition. Volume I. Geckonidæ ... London: Trustees of the British Museum (Natural History). (Taylor and Francis, printers). xii + 436 pp. + Plates I-XXXII. (Hemidactylus bowringii, new combination, p. 139 + Plate XII, figure 2).
Gray JE (1845). Catalogue of the Specimens of Lizards in the Collection of the British Museum. London: Trustees of the British Museum. (Edward Newman, printer). xxviii + 289 pp. (Doryura bowringii, new species, p. 156).
Liang, Yun-Sheng; Wang, Chin-Shiang (1973). "Comparative study of osteology on the House Geckos, Hemidactylus bowringii (Gray) and Hemidactylus frenatus Dumeril & Bibron, from Taiwan". Fu Jen Studies  (7): 63–123.
McMahan CD, Zug GR (2007). "Burmese Hemidactylus (Reptilia, Squamata, Gekkonidae): geographic variation in the morphology of Hemidactylus bowringii in Myanmar and Yunnan, China". Proceedings of the California Academy of Science 58: 485–509.
Xu D-D, Ji X (2007). "Sexual dimorphism, female reproduction and egg incubation in the oriental leaf-toed gekko (Hemidactylus bowringii) from southern China". Zoology 110 (1): 20–27.

Hemidactylus
Reptiles of Japan
Reptiles described in 1845
Taxa named by John Edward Gray